Idris Williams was a Welsh footballer who played as a wing half for Rochdale between 1930 and 1932.

References

Rochdale A.F.C. players
Rossendale United F.C. players
Welsh footballers
Association football midfielders